Palirisa archivicina is a moth in the family Eupterotidae. It was described by Felix Bryk in 1944. It is found in Myanmar.

References

Moths described in 1944
Eupterotinae